Shuiding, formerly Suiding (Suiting) is a town in the Ili Kazakh Autonomous Prefecture,  Xinjiang Uyghur Autonomous Region, China and the county seat of Huocheng County.

, Shuiding had a population of 29,277.

History

Qing dynasty 

Suiding was built in 1762 during the reign of the Qianlong Emperor after the Revolt of the Altishahr Khojas was pacified. From 1762 to 1765 Suiding was the seat of the Governor General of Xinjiang, the General of Ili. In 1765 the General of Ili moved to the larger fortress of Huiyuan. 

Huiyuan suffered severe damage during the Dungan Revolt of 1862–77 when the besieged General of Ili, Mingsioi, blew himself up in his palace rather than surrender to the rebels, and during the Russian occupation that followed between 1871-81. The Russians left pursuant to the 1881 Treaty of Saint Petersburg. From 1882 to 1894 the General of Ili resided at Suiding, while a new Huiyuan fortress was being rebuilt.

In 1888 Suiding County (now Huocheng County and Khorgas) was established. Suiding was the county seat.

The town's name was commonly transcribed in the West as Suidun. The 1911 Encyclopædia Britannica described "Suidun" as "a military town, with provision stores, an arsenal and an arms workshop. Its walls are armed with steel guns."

Unlike the city of Yining, originally known as Ningyuan, which has always remained the commercial center of the region, the 19th century Huiyuan/Suiding was mostly a fortress and an administrative town. It was known to the Russians as the New Kuldja, Chinese Kuldja, or Manchu Kuldja, to distinguish it from Yining (the Old Kuldja or the Taranchi Kuldja). This usage is no longer current.

People's Republic 
With the creation of the Ili Prefecture in 1950, the then existing Suiding County was included into the Area, as was
the neighboring Huocheng County; in 1955, the Ili Special Area became Ili Kazakh Autonomous Prefecture. In 1965, the name Suiding was replaced with more politically correct Shuiding, with 'shui' ('water') replacing 'sui' ("to pacify"). The next year (1966), Shuiding County was merged into Huocheng County, and the Huocheng County county seat was transferred to Shuiding town.

Present 
The original Huiyuan site is now a separate town of Huiyuan within the same Huocheng County as Shuiding. Huiyuan's population was reported as 20,564 by the Year 2000 Census.

Some of the Qing period buildings, including a bell tower and a "Governor General's Pavilion", have been rebuilt at the Huiyuan site as a tourist attraction, often referred to as the "Huiyuan Old Town".

Further reading  
 Huocheng County information, at the China Administrative Division info site 
 Suidun in Brockhaus and Efron Encyclopedic Dictionary 
 
 伊犁惠远城 (Ili's Huiyuan City) 
 Henry Lansdell, "Russian Central Asia: Including Kuldja, Bokhara, Khiva and Merv". Full text available at Google Books; there is also a 2001 facsimile reprint of the 1885 edition, . (Chapters XIV-XVII describe Lansdell visit to the area in the early 1880s, soon after the Russian withdrawal. He visited "Suidun" (Suiding), mentioned already ruined "Ili or Manchu Kuldja" (Huiyancheng), and then went to "Taranchi Kuldja" (Yining))

References

Populated places in Xinjiang